Elizabeth Moore may refer to:
Elisabeth Moore (1876–1959), American tennis champion 
Elizabeth Moore (educator) (1832-1930), seminary principal in West Virginia
Betty R. Moore (born 1934), Australian athlete who ran for Great Britain
Beth Moore (born 1957), founder of Living Proof Ministries, an evangelical Christian organization for women
Elizabeth Moore (historian) (1894–1976), American local historian